Astrid Gunilla Margareta Thors (born 6 November 1957) has been a Member of the Finnish Parliament 19 March 2003 – 4 September 2013. A Finnish-Swedish politician, formerly of the Swedish People's Party, Thors is a Candidate of Law and held several senior jobs before becoming a Member of the European Parliament in 1996 where she worked until 2004. From 2005–2007 she chaired the Swedish Assembly of Finland.

After the 2007 elections she was chosen to be the new Minister of Migration and European Affairs in Matti Vanhanen's second cabinet.

During 2007 and 2011 Thors became a target of the increasing anti-immigration and anti-European Union sentiment. She received death threats that were consequently investigated by the police, and faced a lot of criticism, in parliament and especially on chat and blogging sites. This regardless of the fact that during her term, the Finnish immigration policy continued to tighten outside the EU directives. The critique Minister Thors faced subsequently led to a decision not to continue this ministerial position in Prime Minister Katainen's government, and immigration policy was returned under the Interior Minister's wings and EU policy was given to the new position of the Minister of European Affairs and Foreign Trade.

From 20 August 2013 to 19 August 2016 she was at the position of OSCE High Commissioner on National Minorities. At this post she was preceded by Ambassador Knut Vollebaek of Norway and succeeded by Ambassador Lamberto Zannier of Italy.

Thors went to the Swedish co-educational school Nya svenska samskolan.

Personal life 
In 2004, Thors married Juhani Terho Antero Turunen.

References

Sources 
CV of Astrid Thors

1957 births
Living people
Women government ministers of Finland
Finnish bloggers
Politicians from Helsinki
Swedish People's Party of Finland MEPs
MEPs for Finland 1996–1999
MEPs for Finland 1999–2004
20th-century women MEPs for Finland
21st-century women MEPs for Finland
Finnish women bloggers
Finnish people of Swedish descent